Djurgårdens IF is a Swedish professional association football club based in Stockholm. The club was formed on Djurgården in 1891 and took up football in 1899. Djurgårdens IF played its first league match on 6 July 1902, a 3–0 win against AIK. Djurgården first won promotion to the Allsvenskan in 1927–28 season.

The team competes in Allsvenskan as of the 2015 season; this is Djurgårdens IF's 15th consecutive season in the top flight, and their 60th overall. Djurgårdens IF's first team has competed in a number of leagues, and its record against each club faced in these competitions is listed below. The team that Djurgårdens IF have met the most times in league competition are AIK, from Solna, against whom Djurgårdens IF have contested 143 league matches.

Key
The list includes matches from Svenska Bollspelsförbundets serie (in 1902), Svenska Bollspelsförbundets tävlingsserie klass 1 (in 1905), Stockholmsserien Klass 1 (from 1906 to 1910), Svenska Serien (from 1911–12 to 1916–17 and in 1920–21), Fyrkantsserien (from 1918 to 1919), Svenska Serien Östra (from 1922–23 to 1923–24), Division 2 Östsvenska (from 1924–25 to 1926–27), Allsvenskan (in 1927–28, in 1936–37, from 1945–46 to 1947–48, 1949-50 to 1960, from 1962 to 1981, in 1986, from 1988 to 1992, from 1995 to 1996, in 1999, and from 2001 to present day), Division 2 Norra (in 1928–29, from 1937–38 to 1944–45 and from 1982 to 1985), Division 2 Östra (from 1932–33 to 1935–36), Division 2 Nordöstra (from 1948–49), Division 2 Svealand (in 1961), Division 1 Norra (in 1987, from 1993 to 1994 and from 1997 to 1998), Superettan (in 2000)
These statistics do not include results from the Allsvenskan play-offs (held between 1982 and 1990), but those from Mästerskapsserien and Kvalsvenskan (held in 1991 and 1992) are included. The Allsvenskan play-off round was held in cup format at the end of the league season to decide the national champions, while Mästerskapsserien was an additional league stage with the same purpose.
The name used for each opponent is the name they had when Djurgårdens IF most recently played a league match against them. Results against each opponent include results against that club under any former name. For example, results against Ljungskile SK include matches played against Panos Ljungskile SK (1997–02).
The columns headed "First" and "Last" contain the first and most recent seasons in which Djurgårdens IF played league matches against each opponent.
The counting starts from when Djurgårdens IF started to play at the national league level. Some results from the 1942–43 season and before are missing and therefore for the teams involved in those cases only the total number of matches are shown.

All-time league record
Statistics correct as of matches played on 1 November 2015.

Notes

References

League Record By Opponent
Swedish football club statistics
Djurgardens IF